Heart Butte Dam is a dam in Grant County of southwestern North Dakota. The dam was a project of the United States Bureau of Reclamation completed in 1949, primarily for irrigation and flood control.  The earthen dam is 142 feet in height and impounds the Heart River.

Lake Tschida is the reservoir created by the dam, with about 3400 acres of water surface, about 55 miles of shoreline, and with a capacity of over 214,000 acre-feet of water.  The name Tschida comes from the first mayor of Glen Ullin, North Dakota, the Vienna-born Michael Tschida Sr., elected in 1906 and a strong proponent of the dam project.  The Heart Butte Reservoir State Game Management Area stands on the southern shore of the lake.  As the only sizable body of water in the area, it is popular for recreational fishing, camping, boating, and other activities.

See also 
List of dams and reservoirs in North Dakota
List of dams in the Missouri River watershed

References

External links 
Heart Butte Dam - USBR
Lake Tschida Info
Lake Tschida visitors page

Dams in North Dakota
Reservoirs in North Dakota
United States Bureau of Reclamation dams
Bodies of water of Grant County, North Dakota
Earth-filled dams
Dams completed in 1949